Valentín Dreke (June 21, 1898 – September 25, 1929) was a Cuban baseball outfielder in the Negro leagues. He played from 1919 to 1927, doing so with the Cuban Stars (East) and Cuban Stars (West). He also played winter ball with the famed Almendares team on three occasions. He led the Negro National League in batting average in 1924, hitting .389 in 46 games played. In his eight years of Negro league ball, he batted at least .296 in each season.  He died of tuberculosis in 1929. He was elected to the Cuban Baseball Hall of Fame in 1945.

References

External links
 and Baseball-Reference Black Baseball stats and Seamheads

1898 births
1929 deaths
Almendares (baseball) players
Cuban Stars (East) players
Cuban Stars (West) players
Cuban baseball players
20th-century deaths from tuberculosis
Tuberculosis deaths in Cuba
Baseball outfielders
People from Matanzas Province